{{Infobox comics team and title

|group= y
|image= Darkstars (circa 1992).png
|caption= Ferrin Colos and his Darkstar deputies, in Darkstars #3 (December 1992). Art by Larry Stroman (pencils), Scott Hanna (inks), and Juliana Ferriter (colors).
|publisher= DC Comics
|debut= Darkstars #1 (October 1992)
|creators=Michael Jan Friedman (writer)Larry Stroman (artist)
|base= 
|members=2nd GenerationTomar-TuGuy GardnerCountless unnamed members1st GenerationAliensAdministrator Sleer PrigatzCaptain ZiforFerrin ColosChaser BronMunchukMerayn DethalisNuvah JeddigarXaxVarixLottaHollika RahnGalius ZedG'nortMedphyllHumans John StewartDonna TroyCarla WhiteMo DouglasJohn FlintCharlie Vicker

|title               = Darkstars
|cvr_image           =Darkstars01.jpg
|cvr_caption         = The heroic Darkstars made their debut on the issue of Darkstars #1 (October 1992). Art by Travis Charest & Larry Stroman.
|schedule            = Monthly
|format              = Ongoing series
|ongoing             = Y
|genre               = Superhero
|date                = (vol. 1)October 1992 – January 1996
|1stishhead          = 
|1stishyr            = 
|1stishmo             = 
|endishyr            = 
|endishmo            = 
|1stishhead1         = 
|1stishyr1           = 
|1stishmo1           = 
|endishyr1           = 
|endishmo1           = 
|issues              =  (vol. 1): 38|writers             = Michael Jan Friedman 
|pencillers          = Larry StromanTravis CharestPatrick ZircherMitch ByrdMike Collins
|inkers              = 
|letterers           = 
|colorists           = 
|editors             = 
|creative_team_month = 
|creative_team_year  = 
|creators_series     = 
|TPB                 = 

|cat                 = teams
|subcat              = DC Comics
|altcat              = 
|hero                = y
|sortkey             = Darkstars
}}
The first Darkstars were a group of intergalactic policemen that appeared in comic books published by DC Comics. They were introduced in Darkstars #1 (October 1992), and were created by Michael Jan Friedman and Larry Stroman. The series lasted a total of 39 issues, ending with issue #38 (Jan. 1996), with an issue #0 (Oct. 1994) published between issues #24 and 25 during the Zero Hour crossover event storyline.

Publication history
The Controllers
The Darkstars were created and run by the Controllers, an offshoot of the Guardians of the Universe. Though their goal was to establish order in the universe, the ancient Maltusian race known as the Controllers were isolationists by nature.

Creation
The Controllers created NEMO, the Network for the Establishment and Maintenance of Order, for the purpose of isolating the troubles of the galaxy away from the Controllers' domain. Over the millennia, the Controllers realized they would have to take a more active stance by attacking chaos at its roots. Despite all the good they did, there were too many NEMO operatives in too many different places. NEMO and the Controllers devised a new plan to ensure order, which resulted in the creation of the Darkstars. The first of these new protectors was named Druu, one of a thousand to carry the name Darkstar.

Expansion
The first Darkstar to arrive on Earth was named Ferrin Colos. He arrived on Earth while tracking the supervillain Evil Star. He was authorised to appoint two humans as his deputies, giving them less powerful versions of the Darkstar uniform.

The Controllers expanded the Darkstar project after the collapse of the Green Lantern Corps Central Power Battery on Oa. The Darkstars would fill the void left by the failure of the Guardians' legions. After the Corps' collapse, many former Green Lanterns served in the Darkstar organization. Former Lantern John Stewart was appointed field leader. Donna Troy also joined their ranks.

Downfall
As time went on, the Controllers expressed concerns about the effectiveness of the Darkstars. More specifically, they were troubled that Darkstar agents were mostly looking after their own agendas rather than those of the Controllers.

They withdrew their support from the Darkstars. This made many of the early Darkstar uniforms useless, as they relied on energy transmitted from the Controllers. The later, self-contained suits were unaffected. Many Darkstars were killed or lost their battlesuits in combat against Grayven, son of Darkseid, on the planet Rann. Grayven also crippled John Stewart, paralyzing him from the waist down. Green Lantern Kyle Rayner ended the battle, but the Darkstars were shattered by the losses. In the end, only four Darkstars remained to help rebuild Ranagar.

Later, the last of the Darkstars (Ferrin Colos, Chaser Bron & Munchuk) gave their lives saving the universe from the energy vampire called Starbreaker. They siphoned off a considerable amount of power from him, which helped save the day, but their suits ruptured and all of them were disintegrated.

Rebirth?
In the 2006 Omega Men and Mystery in Space miniseries, an organization called the Darkstars is active in the Vega system, serving as clergy and missionaries for Lady Styx. It is implied that Styx merely appropriated the old Darkstars' uniforms and equipment and gave them to her minions.

Manhunter

Among the equipment stolen by prosecutor Kate Spencer when she becomes the eighth Manhunter is an exo-mantle which formerly belonged to an unnamed Darkstar. As seen in Manhunter #32 (September 2008), the exo-mantle reacts adversely to a Reach scarab bonded to Blue Beetle Jaime Reyes. It appears as if the Controllers programmed an instinctive hatred of the Reach into all exo-mantles, just like the Guardians of the Universe did with the Power Rings worn by the Green Lantern Corps.

DC Rebirth
The Controllers reveal themselves to be on the brink of extinction, and started kidnapping the Guardians of the Universe in order to use their DNA to create new conditions. By trapping them in a machine, the Controllers mined the Guardians' ancient Maltusian genes and twisted them into their own image, transforming them into Controllers. They are able to add three Guardians of the Universe to their number before being defeated by the Green Lantern Corps. It is also revealed that they possess a new set of Darkstars' exo-mantles which they plan to launch into the universe in order to match the power of the Guardians of the Universe.

It is later revealed that when Batman, Wonder Woman, Hal Jordan, Aquaman and Superman used the tenth metal, which as the ability to create or destroy matter based on its wielders' desires, to defeat Barbatos and rebuilt all the destruction made by him and his Dark Nights, they inadvertently added sublimated desires into the Universe, being the new set of Darkstars' exo-mantles one of the new things forged from their own dark desires.

According to the Controllers, the new set of Darkstars' mantles took decades to perfect, are far more lethal than the previous generation and possess tactical capabilities that surpass those of the Green Lanterns; however, to the Controllers' dismay, they soon discover that the Darkstars' mantles are beyond their control when one activated itself and began searching for a suitable  volunteer all the while ignoring the Controllers' orders. Tomar-Tu later reveals to Hal Jordan that the mantles gained consciousness of their own and, after bonding with a suitable volunteer, it trapped all the Controllers in order to use their psionic powers to link all Darkstars' thoughts and use the cosmic energy inside their bodies to fuel their foundry. During the last stand against the Darkstars, Hal Jordan with help from Hammond is able to break the connection between the Controllers and the Darkstars and after using his own willpower, Hal is able to make all Darkstars' mantles malfunction, ending their apparent threat.

Powers and abilities
 The Controllers' agents, the Darkstars, wore a suit of armor called an "exo-mantle'''" which granted the wearer incredible power. Strength, speed, and agility could be increased to superhuman levels while a personal forcefield protected against impact and energy weapons. The forcefield could be expanded somewhat to allow the Darkstar to take others into his/her/its protection and was able to absorb kinetic impact as well. With the exo-mantle, one could achieve high speeds during flight, all the while protected from wind friction by the energy shielding.
 The exo-mantle came equipped with twin maser units capable of firing energy bolts with pinpoint accuracy. Darkstars were often surgically altered to gain instant maser control, rather than the split-second delay in reaction time when wearing the less powerful deputy version of the exo-mantle. Additionally, a powerful, shoulder-mounted cannon complemented the maser system.
 Though the Darkstars could operate in space, for longer trips they were given a personal space cruiser, affectionately known as a "puddle jumper". In addition, NEMO boasted larger cruisers, capable of transporting a squadron of Darkstars. With the cruisers, the Darkstars could operate at great distances, independent from the Controllers' homeworld. The gap between a Darkstar and a Controller meant that they had to act on their own. Decisions had to be made without any hesitation.

References

External links
 
 
 
 
 DCU Guide: Darkstars #27

Green Lantern titles
DC Comics aliens
DC Comics extraterrestrial superheroes
Comics characters introduced in 1992
DC Comics law enforcement agencies
Green Lantern characters